Kalateh-ye Fathabad-e Sharqi (also Romanized as Kalāteh-ye Fatḩābād-e Sharqī; also known as Fatḩābād) is a village in Sudlaneh Rural District, in the Central District of Quchan County, Razavi Khorasan Province, Iran. At the 2006 census, its population was 64, in 13 families.

References 

Populated places in Quchan County